Six ships of the French Navy have borne the name Inflexible ("Unyielding"):

Ships 
 , a 64-gun 
 , a 74-gun , was initially to be named Inflexible.
 , a 116-gun , was named Inflexible at some point. She was never launched.
 , a 116-gun Océan-class ship of the line, was ordered as Inflexible  and renamed several times while on keel before being eventually launched as Friedland.
 , a 90-gun 
 , a  ballistic submarine.

See also

Notes and references

Notes

References

Bibliography 
 
 

French Navy ship names